Orrcon Steel is an Australian distributor and manufacturer of steel, tube and pipe. Their product range covers RHS, SHS & CHS structural tubular steel, hot rolled structural steel and a variety of fencing, roofing and building accessories. They have employed over 600 Australians to produce and supply steel products.They have a number of branches, stockists and resellers nation-wide at Orrcon Steel.

Orrcon Steel, a part of the BlueScope group, is an Australian distributor and manufacturer of steel, tube and pipe.

Its products include RHS, SHS and CHS structural tubular steel, hot-rolled structural steel and fencing, roofing and building accessories. Orrcon Steel supplies steel, tube and pipe to steel fabricators, furniture and trailer body manufacturers, housing and construction companies and pipeline and infrastructure engineering firms. It has distribution centres in Brisbane, Sydney, Melbourne, Adelaide and Perth.

The company employs over 500 full-time employees, as well as contractors and consultants.

History

Orrcon Steel was formed from the merger of Welded Tube Mills and Hills Tubing division in October 2000. In February 2005, Hills Holdings acquired 100% of Orrcon Steel. In 2007 Orrcon Steel acquired the Impressive Group from Western Australia. In 2010 Orrcon Steel added the SteelBarn business which included the acquisition of five branches in Queensland.

In August 2013, it was announced that BlueScope would be acquiring Orrcon from Hills Limited.

Products

Structural steel
Electric Resistance Welding (ERW) carbon steel structural tubulars. Structural products are used in applications from building structures to sporting arenas, major mining and industry infrastructure and for aesthetic structural use for airports and shipping terminals.

Precision tube
Square, rectangular, round and oval precision tube.

Hot-rolled structural steel
Universal beams, universal columns, parallel flange channels, angles and merchant bar (including flats, angles and rounds) as well as a broad range of plate from 3 mm up to 200 mm.

Pipelines
Line pipe procurement and logistics services.

Notes

Steel companies of Australia
Manufacturing companies based in Brisbane